Seyyed Salman (also Romanized as Seyyed Salmān; also known as Seyyed Soleymān) is a village in Elhayi Rural District, in the Central District of Ahvaz County, Khuzestan Province, Iran. At the 2006 census, its population was 83, in 11 families.

References 

Populated places in Ahvaz County